The Blackdown Cadet Summer Training Centre is a training centre for Cadets Canada located in CFB Borden, Ontario. Formerly known as the Army Cadet Summer Training Center Blackdown for Royal Canadian Army Cadets, it includes training for the Royal Canadian Air Cadets, and Royal Canadian Sea Cadets since 2003.

Description
It has is the largest summer training centre for cadets in Canada, with approximately 2500 cadets each summer enrolled in 2-, 3-, or 6-week courses. As of 2012, the following courses are available:

 Drill and Ceremonial Instructor (Army Cadets) - Alpha Company;  6 weeks 
 Survival Instructor (Air Cadets)- Bravo Squadron; 6 weeks
 Expedition Instructor (Army Cadets) - Charlie Company;  6 weeks
 Basic Drill and Ceremonial - Delta Squadron (Air Cadets), Echo Company (Army Cadets);  3 weeks
 Basic Fitness and Sports (Tri-Service) - Foxtrot Company; 3 weeks
 Fitness and Sports Instructor (Tri-Service) - Golf Squadron; 6 weeks
 General Training (Army Cadets) - Hotel and India Company;  2 weeks
 The Blackdown Cadet Training Centre School of Military Music (Tri-Service) - Juliet Company;  3 weeks and 6 weeks
 The Blackdown Cadet Training Centre School of Pipes and Drums (Tri-Service) - Kilo Company;  3 weeks and 6 weeks
 Basic Survival (Air Cadets) - Lima Squadron;  3 weeks
 Basic Expedition (Army Cadets) - Mike Company;  3 weeks

History
In the summer of 1943, Army Cadet Camps were organized in eleven locations across Canada for 10 days duration each. In the summer of 1947, the first experimental six-week camp was held at Camp Ipperwash on Lake Huron, North of Sarnia, Ontario. Originally opened on 28 January 1942 as A29 Canadian Infantry Training Centre.

Although A29 CITC ceased operations in 1945, the camp remained open as a training centre for the Regular Force, Reserves. In 1946, the camp was used as a two-week summer camp for army cadets, as an experiment. It was a success and as a result was expanded in 1947 as the summer home of the Central Command Cadet Camp. Cadets attended Basic Training, Signalling, Driver-Mechanics, and Senior Leaders courses.

In 1948, the camp was further expanded and paved the way for similar camps in Dundurn, Vernon and Aldershot in the late 1940s and early 50s.

In 1994, because of a First Nation land claim, the Ipperwash Army Cadet Camp moved to Canadian Forces Base Borden, and was renamed the Blackdown Army Cadet Summer Training Centre.

The first Commanding Officer of this new Cadet Training Centre was LCOL Dirk in 1994. Since then Blackdown has continued to evolve both in the types of courses offered and the facilities themselves. From 1994 until 2003 cadet sleeping quarters and training facilities were modular tents with cots. Since 2003, there have been significant additions including improvements to the sleeping quarters.

In 2003, the first of many tri-force courses arrived in Blackdown Cadet Summer Training Centre.; which meant the closure of the Borden Air Cadet Camp.

In 2012, the training centre saw 179 adult staff members, 193 Staff Cadets and 1819 Course Cadets enter the gates.

In summer 2021, regular and reserve force troops stayed during the summer due to overflow of barracks. Most sports were prohibited for most of the summer, there was 3 suicide attempts, and many assaults.

References

External links
 

Cadet Instructors Cadre (Canada)